Felix Cardona Jr. is a Democratic member of the Chicago City Council representing the 31st Ward.

Political career
Cardona was elected alderman from the 31st Ward of Chicago in 2019, unseating incumbent alderman Milly Santiago.

Cardona assumed office as alderman on May 20, 2019. He is currently a member of the Latino Caucus and the Progressive Reform Caucus. Cardona is affiliated with the Democratic Party.

Criticism from LGBTQ Victory Fund
The LGBTQ Victory Fund, which is a national organization that promotes LGBTQ politicians being elected, criticized Cardona for "homophobic comments" made to his fellow 31st Ward alderman candidate Colin Bird-Martinez who the LGBTQ Victory Fund endorsed. He was also criticized for receiving benefits from Maranatha USA/Maranatha Word Revival which they claim is a "anti-LGBTQ religious organization".

Elections

2019

References

21st-century American politicians
Hispanic and Latino American city council members
Chicago City Council members
Living people
Year of birth missing (living people)
Hispanic and Latino American people in Illinois politics